The Netherlands Football League Championship 1947–1948 was contested by 66 teams participating in six divisions. The national champion would be determined by a play-off featuring the winners of the eastern, northern, two southern and two western football divisions of the Netherlands. BVV Den Bosch won this year's championship by beating sc Heerenveen, Go Ahead, HFC EDO, HFC Haarlem and PSV Eindhoven.

New entrants
Eerste Klasse East:
Promoted from 2nd Division: Zwolsche Boys
Eerste Klasse South-I:
Moving in from South-II: FC Eindhoven, Sittardse Boys, Juliana, Maurits and De Spechten
Promoted from 2nd Division: VV TSC
Eerste Klasse South-II:
Moving in from South-I: SC Helmondia, NAC, NOAD, VC Vlissingen and VVV Venlo
Eerste Klasse West-I:
Moving in from West-II: HBS Craeyenhout, HFC Haarlem, SC Neptunus De Volewijckers and Xerxes
Promoted from 2nd Division: Zeeburgia
Eerste Klasse West-II:
Moving in from West-I: ADO Den Haag, DWS, HFC EDO, Feijenoord and Sparta Rotterdam

Divisions

Eerste Klasse East

Eerste Klasse North

Eerste Klasse South-I

Eerste Klasse South-II

Eerste Klasse West-I

Eerste Klasse West-II

Championship play-off

References
RSSSF Netherlands Football League Championships 1898-1954
RSSSF Eerste Klasse Oost
RSSSF Eerste Klasse Noord
RSSSF Eerste Klasse Zuid
RSSSF Eerste Klasse West

Netherlands Football League Championship seasons
1947–48 in Dutch football
Neth